Daniel Vasile Tătar (born 21 October 1987) is a Romanian footballer under contract with CSC 1599 Șelimbăr. His first match in Liga I was played for CSU Voința Sibiu against Astra Ploiești.

Honours
Hermannstadt
Cupa României: Runner-up 2017–18

Viitorul Șelimbăr
Liga III: 2020–21

External links
 
 

1989 births
Living people
People from Blaj
Romanian footballers
Association football midfielders
Liga I players
CSU Voința Sibiu players
FC Brașov (1936) players
Liga II players
CSM Unirea Alba Iulia players
FC Hermannstadt players
CSC 1599 Șelimbăr players